The Za'im system, also known as zuama clientelism, is a corrupt patronage system in Lebanon. A political boss, known as a Za'im (plural Zuama), is from a leading family in the country's electoral districts. They manipulate elections and distribute political favors and financial rewards to the highest bidder. A za'im can run for office or encourage votes for another to have another in his debt. Votes are often obtained through bribery or force. Individuals elected to parliament view their primary goal to serve the needs of their local clients, neglect any national issues and use parliament to further their regional-sectarian interests. The Za'im dressed in tailored European suits, which misled many visitors at the time. According to As'ad AbuKhalil, many Zuama became warlords during the Lebanese Civil War (1975–1990). He has also stated that they are often sponsored by foreign governments, through which foreign embassies play a role in making political decisions in Lebanon.

Notable Lebanese Zuama
Hassan Nasrallah
Nabih Berri
Kamal Jumblatt
Walid Jumblatt
Joseph Skaff
Saeb Salam
Suleiman Frangieh
Majid Arslan
Kamel Asaad
Riad Al Solh
Henri Philippe Pharaoun
Raymond Eddé
Rafic Hariri
Saad Hariri
Amine Gemayel
Bachir Gemayel
Camille Chamoun

See also
Lebanese Civil War
Lebanese Front
Lebanese National Movement
Politics of Lebanon

References

Bibliography

Alain Menargues, Les Secrets de la guerre du Liban: Du coup d'état de Béchir Gémayel aux massacres des camps palestiniens, Albin Michel, Paris 2004.  (in French)
Denise Ammoun, Histoire du Liban contemporain: Tome 2 1943-1990, Fayard, Paris 2005.  (in French) – 
Edgar O'Ballance, Civil War in Lebanon, 1975-92, Palgrave Macmillan, London 1998. 
Fawwaz Traboulsi, Identités et solidarités croisées dans les conflits du Liban contemporain; Chapitre 12: L'économie politique des milices: le phénomène mafieux, Thèse de Doctorat d'Histoire – 1993, Université de Paris VIII, 2007 (in French)
 Itamar Rabinovich, The war for Lebanon, 1970–1985, Cornell University Press, Ithaca and London 1989 (revised edition). , 0-8014-9313-7 – 
 Rex Brynen, Sanctuary and Survival: the PLO in Lebanon, Boulder: Westview Press, Oxford 1990.  – 
Robert Fisk, Pity the Nation: Lebanon at War, London: Oxford University Press, (3rd ed. 2001).  – 
 Thomas Collelo (ed.), Lebanon: a country study, Library of Congress, Federal Research Division, Headquarters, Department of the Army (DA Pam 550-24), Washington D.C., December 1987 (Third edition 1989). – 

Politics of Lebanon
Corruption in Asia
Political corruption
Political bosses
Political terminology in Lebanon